The Smith Life Master Women's Pairs North American bridge championship is held at the fall American Contract Bridge League (ACBL) North American Bridge Championship (NABC).

The Smith Life Master Women's Pairs is a four session MP pairs event, two qualifying sessions and two final sessions.
The event typically starts on the first Friday of the NABC.
The event is restricted to female players that have achieved a Life Master rating.

History
The event was introduced in 1961.
The event is named after Helen Sobel Smith who won 35 North American trophies.
She is generally recognized as the best female player of all time.

The parallel Life Master Men's Pairs was opened to women in 1990. No pair of women has won that event, but a few women have won the revised competition as part of a mixed pair, and the 1987 Women's winner Jill Meyers has won it twice.

Winners

Only one pair has defended its championship—on three occasions, as Mildred Breed and Shawn Quinn won annually from 1999 to 2002.

See also
Nail Life Master Open Pairs, Men's Pairs before 1990
Whitehead Women's Pairs – the premier North American championship for women pairs, 1930 to present

Sources

 List of previous winners, Page 7. 

 2008 winners, Page 1. 
NABC Winners - ACBL

External links
 NABC Winners: Smith Life Master Womens Pairs – official database view, all years
 "Life Master Women's Pairs – A Look Back". November 19, 2013. ACBL. Retrieved 2014-06-06.

North American Bridge Championships